Dumfries was a constituency of the Scottish Parliament (Holyrood). It elected one Member of the Scottish Parliament (MSP) by the plurality (first past the post) method of election. It was also one of nine constituencies in the South of Scotland electoral region, which elects seven additional members, in addition to the nine constituency MSPs, to produce a form of proportional representation for the region as a whole.

From the Scottish Parliament election, 2011, the Dumfries constituency was abolished, with the city being divided between two new constituencies; Dumfriesshire, and Galloway and West Dumfries.

Electoral region 
See also South of Scotland (Scottish Parliament electoral region)

Constituency boundaries and council area 

The Dumfries constituency was created at the same time as the Scottish Parliament, in 1999, with the name and boundaries of an  existing Westminster constituency. In 2005, however, Scottish Westminster constituencies were mostly replaced with new constituencies.

Member of the Scottish Parliament

Election results

Footnotes 

Politics of Dumfries and Galloway
Scottish Parliament constituencies and regions 1999–2011
1999 establishments in Scotland
Constituencies established in 1999
2011 disestablishments in Scotland
Constituencies disestablished in 2011
Dumfries
Annan, Dumfries and Galloway
Moffat
Lockerbie
Langholm